Faith Keza is the CEO of Irembo Ltd, the Board Member in Rwanda Development Board (RDB) and the Board Member in Central Bank of Rwanda.  She previously worked in Silicon Valley, California as a Software Engineer at Google, Delpix and Oracle.

Education 
In 2007, at 15 years old, Keza joined Gordonstoun Boarding School in Moray, Scotland. She holds Bachelor of Science in Electrical Engineering and Computer science.

References 

21st-century Rwandan women politicians
21st-century Rwandan politicians
Living people
1990s births
Year of birth uncertain
Rwandan women in business